(), also known as bamboo salt, is a form of salt. It is prepared by packing bay salt in a thick bamboo stem, and baking it nine times on high temperature using pine firewood. During the baking processes, the impurities in the bay salts are claimed to be removed or neutralized while its inorganic contents, such as calcium, potassium, iron, copper, and zinc are increased.

Production 
To make , sea salt is packed into bamboo canisters and sealed with yellow clay. The mixture is baked in an iron oven and roasted in a pine fire.

A bamboo stem is filled with bay salt produced from the west coast, sealed with red clay, and baked in a kiln with pine tree firewood. The baked salt lumps harden after baking. It is taken out, crushed, and repacked in the bamboo stem for the next cycle. During baking the salt absorbs the bamboo constituents that bring a distinctive sweetness, which is called Gamrojung flavor. Baking darkens the salt. Afterwards, the bamboo salt contains blue, yellow, red, white and black crystals.

Well-baked bamboo salt, with a temperature above , is called “purple bamboo salt” because of its unique purple color, which indicates the best quality. While the quality of bamboo salt cannot be solely determined by color, its crystal structure and hardiness is definitive.

Korean folk medicine
In Korean folk medicine, trace elements in the yellow clay and bamboo are thought to make this form of salt more healthy.  Historically,  has been used as a digestive aid, styptic, disinfectant or dentifrice.

Oriental medicinalist Insan Kim Il-hoon (1909–1992), was (according to his institution) the first to claim that  could be used to treat cancer. His other claims are that  can be used to treat intestinal inflammation, peptic ulcer disease, dyspepsia, esophageal tumours and more.

References

Traditional Korean medicine
Salts